Ma famille t'adore déjà is a 2016 French comedy film directed by Jérôme Commandeur and Alan Corno.

Plot
Julien, creator of mobile applications falls in love with Eva, a young journalist. She introduces him to her parents. All together find themselves on a weekend that will be memorable for each of them.

Cast

 Arthur Dupont as Julien
 Déborah François as Eva
 Thierry Lhermitte as Jean
 Marie-Anne Chazel as Marie-Laure
 Jérôme Commandeur as Jean-Seb
 Valérie Karsenti as Corinne
 Sabine Azéma as Dahlia
 Alicia Endemann as Anneke
 Catherine Benguigui as Gisèle
 Éric Berger as Lambert
 Marie Borowski as Anouck
 Jean-Yves Chatelais as Roland
 Raphaël Aouizerate as Palefroi
 Samuel Aouizerate as Jean-Jésus
 Catherine Gautier as Elliane
 Hélène Aprea as Lulu
 Fabienne Galula as Marie-Annick
 Valérie Vogt as The turnkey

References

External links

2016 films
French comedy films
2016 comedy films
2010s French films